John Doukas (Iōannēs Doúkas) was a son of the Despot of Epirus, Michael II Komnenos Doukas, and a general in Byzantine service.

John was the second-born son of the Despot of Epirus, Michael II Komnenos Doukas, and Theodora Petraliphaina. In 1261 his mother brought him as a hostage to the Byzantine court at Constantinople, where he married Tornikina Komnene (of unknown first name), the second-born daughter of the sebastokrator Constantine Tornikios. The couple had at least one daughter, Helena, but the marriage was unhappy, with John apparently despising his wife. As a result, he was imprisoned and blinded in 1280, and committed suicide shortly after.

References

Sources
 
 

1280s deaths
13th-century Byzantine people
Komnenodoukas dynasty
People of the Despotate of Epirus
Suicides in the Byzantine Empire